David Michael Bates (born 1952) is an American artist. He is based in Dallas and is known for his Texas-themed paintings, prints, and sculptures.

Biography 
David Michael Bates was born in 1952 in Dallas, Texas. He received a BFA degree in 1975  from Southern Methodist University, and an MFA degree in 1978 from the same institution.

He is best known for his paintings of the Grassy Lakes region of Faulkner County, Arkansas, and the Gulf Coast. He also produces hand-painted sculptures in bronzes, aluminum, and wood.  Whether painting on canvas or on his sculptures, Bates's work is characterized by bold, thick, lush brush strokes. Butchering the Hog, in the collection of the Honolulu Museum of Art, demonstrates the artist's use of bold broad brush strokes, in a way that is reminiscent of Naïve art.

Public collections holding works by Bates include the Art Museum of Southeast Texas (Beaumont), Carnegie Museum of Art (Pittsburgh), the Corcoran Gallery of Art (Washington, D.C.), the Dallas Museum of Art, the High Museum of Art (Atlanta, GA), the Hirshhorn Museum and Sculpture Garden (Washington, D.C.), the Honolulu Museum of Art, the Metropolitan Museum of Art, the San Francisco Museum of Modern Art, the Smithsonian American Art Museum (Washington, DC), and the Whitney Museum of American Art (New York City).

Publications
 Arthur, John, David Bates, 1992, Charles Cowles Gallery, New York, 1992
 Auping, Michael, David Bates: Southern Coast, John Berggruen Gallery, San Francisco, 2017
 Avery, Iustinus Tim, David Bates, Cel Publishing, 2011 
 Bates, David, Southern Coast, Berggruen Gallery, San Francisco, 2017 
 Conrad, Barnaby III, David Bates: The Tropics, John Berggruen Gallery, San Francisco, 2008
 Cozad, Rachel, David Bates. Paintings, Drawings and Sculpture, Talley Dunn Publications, Dallas, TX, 2012
 Little, Carl, David Bates: Paintings and Drawings, DC Moore Gallery, New York, NY, 2004
 Little, Carl, David Bates: The Katrina Paintings, Kemper Museum of Contemporary Art, 2010, 
 Nash, Steven, David Bates, 1995: Sculpture, Charles Cowles Gallery, New York, 1995
 Oliver-Smith, Kerry, The Swamp: On the Edge of Eden, Samuel P. Harn Museum of Art, 2000
 Serwer, Jacquelyn Days, Art Meets Life: The New Work of David Bates, DC Moore Gallery, New York, NY, 2006 
 Spring, Justin, David Bates, DC Moore Gallery, New York, 1999
 Spring, Justin, David Bates, Scala for Modern Art Museum, Forth Worth, 2008 
 Van Keuren, Philip, David Bates: Black & White, Dunn and Brown Contemporary, Dallas, TX, 2001
 Van Keuren, Philip, David Bates: Poems, Dunn and Brown Contemporary, Dallas, TX, 2003
 
 Wei, Lilly, David Bates'', DC Moore Gallery, New York, 2001

References

1952 births
Living people
20th-century American painters
Modern sculptors
Sculptors from Texas
21st-century American painters
People from Dallas
Southern Methodist University alumni